Kentucky Route 22 (KY 22) is a  east–west highway running from the eastern suburbs of Louisville to an unincorporated place called Willow in Bracken County in Northern Kentucky.

Route 22 has a short  business route in Dry Ridge, an area which has become a commercial center as an I-75 exit.

It begins at US 42 at the city limit of a Louisville suburb called Northfield, Kentucky, and carries the name Brownsboro Road, a local road which begins near Downtown Louisville. It crosses the Kentucky River west of Gratz and terminates at Kentucky Route 10 in Willow.

Major intersections

Special routes

East Louisville connector route

Kentucky Route 22C is a connector route of KY 22 that links the road to U.S. Route 42 in eastern Louisville northeast of the Thornhill.

Major intersections

Gratz business route

Kentucky Route 22 Business (KY 22 Bus.) is an unsigned business route in Gratz that runs from Main Street and Brown Street to Kentucky Routes 22 and 355. It is part of an old alignment of KY 22 that approached a bridge over the Kentucky River, which was replaced by a newer bridge further downstream in 2011.

Major intersections

Dry Ridge business route

Kentucky Route 22 Business (KY 22 Business) is a business route of KY 22 in Dry Ridge. The highway runs  between junctions with KY 22 and US 25 Business, passing through the heart of Dry Ridge. It was formed in 2005 with the opening of the Dry Ridge Bypass, which rerouted KY 22 around the city.

Major intersections

See also
Roads in Louisville, Kentucky

References

0022
0022
0022
0022
Transportation in Oldham County, Kentucky
Transportation in Henry County, Kentucky
Transportation in Grant County, Kentucky
Transportation in Pendleton County, Kentucky